William George Harper (born 15 November 1900) was a Scottish professional footballer who played as a goalkeeper for Sunderland.

References

1900 births
People from Bothwell
Scottish footballers
Association football goalkeepers
Wishaw Juniors F.C. players
Sunderland A.F.C. players
Manchester City F.C. players
Crystal Palace F.C. players
Luton Town F.C. players
Weymouth F.C. players
English Football League players
Year of death missing
Place of death missing